Loreto Hockey Club is a women's field hockey club based in Rathfarnham, Dublin 14, Ireland. The club enter teams in the Women's Irish Hockey League, the Irish Senior Cup
and the Irish Junior Cup. Loreto has also represented Ireland in European competitions, winning the 2011 EuroHockey Club Champion's Challenge II and finishing third at the 2014 European Club Championship Trophy.

History

Early years 
Loreto Hockey Club was founded in 1926 by Mother Bernadette and Una Murray to represent past pupils of Loreto schools in Ireland. The club adopted the red wine and white of Loreto College, St Stephen's Green as their club colours. Loreto won its first trophy, the Leinster Cup in 1946.

Irish Senior Cup
Loreto have been regular Irish Senior Cup finalists. On 9 May 2010, with a team that included Nicola Daly, Hannah Matthews, Nikki Symmons, Lizzie Colvin and Alison Meeke, Loreto won the cup after they defeated Railway Union in a penalty shoot-out after the game had finished 2–2. The team was coached by Graham Shaw. Loreto were finalists again in 2012 but this time lost 3–2 against UCD.

Notes

Women's Irish Hockey League
In 2008–09 Loreto, with a team that included Nikki Symmons, Lizzie Colvin, Hannah Matthews and Alison Meeke, won the inaugural Women's Irish Hockey League title. In the league final they defeated a Hermes team that included Nicola Evans, Anna O'Flanagan, Gillian Pinder and Chloe Watkins. Loreto won 2–1 in a penalty shoot-out, becoming the first team in the world to win a title with the new one-on-one format.

Notes

EY Champions Trophy
Loreto won the 2018 EY Champions Trophy and, as a result, qualified to represent Ireland in the 2019 EuroHockey Club Champions Cup.

Irish Junior Cup
Loreto's second team enter the Irish Junior Cup. They won the cup in 2012  and were runners-up in 2016.

Notes

Loreto in Europe
Loreto has also represented Ireland in European competitions on several occasions. In 2011, with a team that included Nicola Daly, Nikki Symmons, Hannah Matthews and Alison Meeke, Loreto won the EuroHockey Club Champion's Challenge II in Lille. In the final they defeated HC Olten of Switzerland 7–1. In 2014 Hannah Matthews captained Loreto to third place at the European Club Championship Trophy tournament hosted by Leicester Hockey Club.

Grounds
The club was originally based in Dartmouth Square. In the 1930s, the club moved to Cherryfield in Templeogue and played on a pitch which was actually a field at the back of one of the club member's houses. In the mid1940s the club moved to the grounds of the Leinster Branch of the Irish Hockey Union in Templeogue, near Ballyboden St. Enda's GAA. During the 1950s, 1960s and 1970s the club remained at the Leinster Branch grounds, sharing the six pitches there with four other clubs. When the Leinster Branch grounds were sold for development in the early 1980s the club was homeless again. The Sisters of Loreto gave the club access to the pitch at Loreto Abbey, Rathfarnham. In 1987, with the Sisters support and after much fundraising, the club laid a floodlit all-weather pitch in Nutgrove School. In the 1997–98 season the club laid its own astro-turf pitch in partnership with the Loreto Beaufort School. The playing surface on the pitch was replaced in September 2006, with a sand-dressed pitch. In 2017–18 the club successfully applied to the Department of Transport, Tourism and Sport for a €150,000 grant to upgrade the pitch. In 2013 the club opened a new clubhouse. In so doing, Loreto became the first women's only hockey club in Ireland to have its own purpose built clubhouse.

Notable players
 internationals
When the Ireland women's national field hockey team won the silver medal at the 2018 Women's Hockey World Cup, the squad included five current or former Loreto players. Nicola Daly, Hannah Matthews and Alison Meeke were all members of Loreto's 2017–18 squad. Lizzie Colvin and Elena Tice were both former Loreto players.

 Ireland women's cricket internationals
 Nikki Symmons
 Elena Tice

Notable coaches
  Graham Shaw

Honours
EuroHockey Club Champion's Challenge II
Winners: 2011: 1
Women's Irish Hockey League
Winners: 2008–09: 1
Runners Up: 2011–12, 2012–13, 2014–15: 3 
Irish Senior Cup
Winners: 1940, 1946, 1953, 1960, 2001–02, 2002–03, 2009–10: 8 
Runners Up: 1955, 1957, 1977, 1993, 2011–12: 5
Irish Junior Cup
Winners: 1946, 1948, 1955, 2005, 2012: 5 
Runners Up: 2016: 1
EY Champions Trophy
Winners: 2018

References

Women's Irish Hockey League teams
Rathfarnham
Sisters of Loreto
1926 establishments in Ireland
Field hockey clubs established in 1926
Field hockey clubs in County Dublin